Jeff Davis (born June 13, 1975) is an American writer and television producer. He is best known for creating the drama series Criminal Minds and Teen Wolf, the latter being a reboot of the 1985 film of the same name.

Early life
Davis was born in Milford, Connecticut. He graduated from Vassar College with a degree in film and he then went on to receive a master's degree in screenwriting from the University of Southern California. Davis worked as a script reader, editorial assistant, writer for computer software manuals and computer support specialist in Los Angeles while struggling to sell his own writing.

Career
In 2003, Davis sold a script to CBS Television that eventually became the hit series Criminal Minds. He served as co-executive producer during the first season of the show.

In 2011, Davis began talks with MTV about a reboot of the Michael J. Fox '80s comedy Teen Wolf. He says he jumped at the project due to his love of the horror genre. He notes among his influences writers Stephen King and Thomas Harris. Davis has also stated that he is a fan of The X-Files, Cheers, and Moonlighting. As executive producer, head writer and show creator, Jeff Davis was the creative force behind Teen Wolf.

After the second season of Teen Wolf ended, Davis split his time between Los Angeles and Atlanta, Georgia, where he filmed the show. Davis sold a series adaption of the Swedish horror film Let the Right One In, for the U.S. television channel A&E. The script was then ordered to pilot at TNT. The pilot was shot in Vancouver, but ultimately, TNT decided not to proceed with a series. More recently, he signed a deal with MTV Entertainment Studios through his First Cause production company.

Personal life
Davis is openly gay. Davis is also a fan of Batman, to the point of even naming characters from his hit TV show Teen Wolf, after characters in Batman.

Filmography

References

External links
 

1975 births
Living people
American television writers
American male television writers
American gay writers
LGBT television producers
American LGBT screenwriters
LGBT people from Connecticut
People from Milford, Connecticut
Showrunners
Television producers from California
USC School of Cinematic Arts alumni
Vassar College alumni
Writers from Atlanta
Writers from Los Angeles
Screenwriters from California
Screenwriters from Connecticut
Screenwriters from Georgia (U.S. state)
Television producers from Connecticut